Isabel Douglas, Countess of Mar ( 13601408) was Countess of Mar.

Isabel was the sister of the famous James 2nd Earl of Douglas and Earl of Mar, who died leading the Scots to victory at the Battle of Otterburn. He died without any legitimate children and his sister Isabel inherited most of his property, excluding only the Douglas lands which could only pass through the male line. After being confirmed as countess she then became the most sought after bride in the realm and soon was married to Sir Malcolm Drummond, brother-in-law of King Robert III. This marriage however failed to produce any children and the Countess soon became the focus of several plots to usurp her lands by scheming noblemen.

While the couple resided at the chief seat to the Earldom of Mar, Kildrummy Castle, Sir Malcolm was frequently away on royal business, being one of King Robert's close advisors. In 1402, while Sir Malcolm was away at one of his other castles, he was suddenly attacked by a large group of highlanders led by the infamous Alexander Stewart, illegitimate son of the Wolf of Badenoch. Alexander then proceeded to capture the castle and put Sir Malcolm into one of his dungeons where he soon died at the hands of his captor. Because the king was by this time sick and infirm and real power was in the hands of his younger brother the Duke of Albany, Isabel was now completely isolated and was now easy prey for her husband's murderer. In the summer of 1404, Alexander and his gang of highlanders descended on her castle of Kildrummy and captured it along with the Countess and was soon able to extort from her a signed document promising to marry Alexander and give over to him all of her lands, including the earldom of Mar and lordship of the Garioch. Under normal circumstances this incident possibly would not have been allowed to stand, but Isabel had the misfortune that these events took place during the regency of the Duke of Albany, who was in fact the uncle of this Alexander Stewart. Because his relation to the Royal Family and friendship with his uncle saved him from any actual punishment, Isabel was forced to marry the man who murdered her husband and live the last four years of her life as a captive. She died in the year 1408 without children. The earldom of Mar then reverted to the crown and was later given to John Erskine, 6th Lord Erskine, whose descendants hold it to this day.

See also

Margaret, Countess of Mar
Alexander Stewart, Earl of Mar
Earl of Mar

References

 Nigel Tranter, The Stewart Trilogy, Dunton Green, Sevenoaks, Kent : Coronet Books, 1986. . Lords of Misrule, 1388–1396. A Folly of Princes, 1396–1402. The Captive Crown, 1402–1411.

External links
 Women in power
 The Ancient Earldom of Mar

1360s births
1408 deaths
Year of birth uncertain
People from Aberdeenshire
Earls or mormaers of Mar
Scottish countesses
14th-century Scottish earls
15th-century Scottish peers
Isabel
14th-century Scottish women
15th-century Scottish women